Morteza Aziz-Mohammadi (born 8 August 1985) is an Iranian footballer who currently plays for Giti Pasand in Azadegan League.

Club career
In 2009, Aziz-Mohammadi joined Pas Hamedan F.C. after spending the previous 3 seasons at Paykan F.C. On 14 July 2011, he was joined to the Shahin Bushehr.

 Assist Goals

Honours

Club
Hazfi Cup
Runner up:1
2011–12 with Shahin Bushehr

References

Iranian footballers
Paykan F.C. players
Living people
1985 births
Pas players
Giti Pasand players
Shahin Bushehr F.C. players
Association football midfielders